The Entertainment Merchants Association (EMA) is the not-for-profit international trade association dedicated to advancing the interests of the $32 billion home entertainment industry.

The Mission of EMA is to promote, to protect, and to provide a forum for, the common business interests of those engaged in the sale, rental, and licensed reproduction of entertainment software, such as motion pictures, video games, and sound recordings.

History
The Entertainment Merchants Association was established in 2006 through the merger of the Interactive Entertainment Merchants Association (IEMA) and the Video Software Dealers Association (VSDA). VSDA was organized in 1981 to help video retail stores fight against federal legislation that would have changed the first-sale doctrine. VSDA was initiated under the auspices of NARM (National Association of Recording Merchandisers), and was headed by Association staff President Risa Solomon.

On January 17, 2020, the Entertainment Merchants Association became OTT.X.

Composition
EMA represents more than 1,000 companies throughout the United States, Canada, and other nations. Its members operate more than 20,000 retail outlets in the U.S. that sell and/or rent DVDs and computer and console video games. Membership comprises the full spectrum of retailers (from single-store specialists to multi-line mass merchants), distributors, the home video divisions of major and independent motion picture studios, video game publishers, and other related businesses that constitute and support the home entertainment industry.

Legal activity

References

External links

Arts and media trade groups
Entertainment industry associations